The 1987 Winfield State League was the 6th season of the Queensland Rugby League's statewide competition. The competition was run similarly to the NSWRL's Amco Cup, featuring a short format prior the larger Brisbane Premiership season. The Wynnum Manly Seagulls defeated the Redcliffe Dolphins in the final at Lang Park in Brisbane, winning their fourth straight title.

Teams 
A total of 14 teams competed in the 1986 season, 8 of which were BRL Premiership clubs. The remaining six were regional teams from across the state.

Ladder

Finals 
Wynnum Manly, Redcliffe, Brisbane Brothers and Toowoomba were the semi finalists.

Source:

References 

Queensland Rugby League
Rugby league in Brisbane
Winfield State League season